Ficus arnottiana, commonly known as the Indian rock fig, is a species of fig tree, native to India.

Indian rock fig is a tree which is commonly mistaken for peepal (Ficus religiosa).  One of the common ways of recognizing Ficus arnottiana from Ficus religiosa is to examine the color of the leaf-stalk and the veins which are bright pink to red in color. The leaf tips of F. religiosa are tapering, acuminate and long as against the leaf tips of F. arnottiana which are pointed and acuminate but not long.

References

External links

arnottiana
Flora of the Indian subcontinent